Daliganj Junction railway station is one of the suburban railway stations in Lucknow district, Uttar Pradesh. Its code is DAL.

Related projects

Aishbagh Junction terminal
This project was started on 1 May along with gauge conversion from metre to broad from very same station to Pilibhit. In this project railway will develop this station as terminal for many northwest- and north-bound trains (from Delhi, Sitapur, Pilibhit, Tanakpur, Shahjahanpur, Behraich, Mailani, Lalkuan, Kathgodam). Seven platforms are under construction with a washing pit line and loop line along with an entirely new large station building and dual entrance.

Gauge conversion
This project started on 15 May 2016. Under this project metre-gauge lines from Lucknow to Tanakpur will be converted to broad gauge under three phases, where first phase Aishbagh to Sitapur is expected to be completed by July or August 2018 however second phase Sitapur to Mailani is expected to be completed by end of 2018 or early 2019.

Aishbagh–Manaknagar bypass
Under this project a one-kilometer rail track will be constructed from Aishbagh station to Manak nagar through RDSO area of the city so that long-distance trains for Gorakhpur will directly pass from Aishbagh to Manak Nagar without going to Lucknow Junction and thus avoiding the time loss in engine reversal.

Gomti Nagar Terminal
Under this project NER will develop a world-class railway station at Gomti Nagar. Six platforms will be made here. This station will act as terminal for north- and northeast-bound trains (like for Delhi, Gonda, Gorakhpur, Balrampur, etc.)

Circular train
Honorable Home Minister Rajnath Singh Ji has announced that a local train just like that of Mumbai will run on Aishbagh–Lucknow city–Daliganj–Badshahnagar–Gomtinagar–Malhour–Juggaur–Malhour–Dilkusha–Gwarigaon–Charbagh route to ease the pressure on the roads. The reports are already submitted and date for starting the project will soon be announced.

ASH–MAL doubling and electrification
NER will double and electrify the rail track from Aishbagh to Malhour via Rakabganj to increase the speed of trains on this route.

Trains

EMU/MEMU/DEMU services from Daliganj

References

Railway stations in Lucknow district
Lucknow NER railway division